In computer networking and telecommunications, a switched communication network is a communication network which uses switching for connection of two non-adjacent nodes.

Switched communication networks are divided into circuit switched networks, message switched networks, and packet switched networks.

See also
 Broadcast communication network
 Fully connected network

Network architecture